Giacomo de' Giacomelli was a Roman Catholic prelate who served as Bishop of Belcastro (1542–1552).

On 5 May 1542, Giacomo de' Giacomelli was appointed during the papacy of Pope Paul III as Bishop of Belcastro.
He served as Bishop of Belcastro until his resignation on 14 Dec 1552.

While bishop, he was the principal co-consecrator of Giulio Antonio Santorio, Archbishop of Santa Severina (1566).

References

External links and additional sources
 (for Chronology of Bishops) 
 (for Chronology of Bishops) 

16th-century Italian Roman Catholic bishops
Bishops appointed by Pope Paul III